Pelliceira (Asturian, Piliceira) is one of eleven parishes (administrative divisions) in the municipality of Ibias, within the province and autonomous community of Asturias, in northern Spain.

Villages and hamlets

 Arandojo (Arandoxo)
 Pelliceira

References

Parishes in Ibias